Kremenchuk Steel Works is located in Kremenchuk, Poltava Oblast, Ukraine. The main activity of the plant is the production of cast parts, freight cars, auto coupling mechanisms, parts for KrAZ vehicles, custom castings for production, and other heavy industry enterprises. The plant was established in 1966.

See also

AvtoKrAZ
Kryukiv Railway Car Building Works
List of metallurgical companies in Ukraine

References

Companies disestablished in 2014
Steel companies of Ukraine
Companies established in 1966